Meredith Dixon is an American politician and businesswoman serving as a member of the New Mexico House of Representatives from the 20th district. Elected in 2020, she assumed office on January 19, 2021.

Early life and education 
Dixon was born in Ossining, New York. She earned a Bachelor of Arts degree from Chatham University in 1999 and a Master of Arts from the University of Pittsburgh in 2002.

Career 
Dixon is the founder of Blue Advantage Partners, a political consulting and fundraising firm based in New Mexico. Dixon previously worked as an aide for Senator Tom Udall and State House Speaker Brian Egolf. After incumbent Democrat Abbas Akhil announced that he would not seek re-election in 2020, Dixon declared her candidacy to succeed him. Dixon defeated Republican nominee Michael Hendricks in the November general election and assumed office in January 2021.

References 

People from Ossining, New York
Chatham University alumni
University of Pittsburgh alumni
Democratic Party members of the New Mexico House of Representatives
Women state legislators in New Mexico
Living people
Year of birth missing (living people)
21st-century American politicians
21st-century American women politicians